Cardinal Points is a bilingual annual literary magazine published in English and Russian by 
Slavic studies department of Brown University. It was founded by Oleg Woolf in 2010  to focus on the work of great 20th century writers Andrei Platonov, Varlam Shalamov, and Vassily Grossman. Its editors include Irina Mashinski, Robert Chandler and Boris Dralyuk.

References

External links
Cardinal Points online (official website)

Literary magazines published in the United States
Annual magazines published in the United States
Bilingual magazines
Magazines published in Rhode Island
Magazines established in 2010